Nemanja Matić (born 1 August 1988) is a Serbian professional footballer who plays as a defensive midfielder for Italian Serie A club Roma. Starting his career as an attacking midfielder, Matić shifted to a defensive midfielder during his spell at Benfica. He is known for his consistent performances on the pitch and his combative style of play.

Matić began his senior career at Kolubara, before joining Slovak side Košice in 2007. He moved to English club Chelsea for £1.5 million in 2009. Used sparingly during his first spell at the club, he spent the 2010–11 season on loan at Dutch club Vitesse, and in the summer of 2011, he moved to Benfica as part of a swap deal involving David Luiz. He won the Primeira Liga Player of the Year award for his performances in the 2012–13 season. Matić returned to Chelsea in January 2014, for £21 million. He was named in the PFA Team of the Year for the 2014–15 season. In July 2017, he was reunited with former Chelsea manager José Mourinho after signing for Manchester United.

Matić represented Serbia at under-21 level. He made his senior international debut in 2008 and scored twice in 48 appearances. He was part of Serbia's squad at the 2018 FIFA World Cup.

Club career

Early career
Matić was born in Šabac, SR Serbia. He began playing football at age five with FK Vrelo from the eponymous village, coached by his own father. He began his senior career at Kolubara, before signing for Slovak club Košice in 2007. While living in the country, he also received Slovak citizenship.

Chelsea
On 18 August 2009, Matić signed for Chelsea from Košice for a fee of around £1.5 million on a four-year contract, having been on trial at Middlesbrough. He was given the number 24 shirt by Chelsea but was not able to make his debut immediately due to the injury he picked up at the 2009 UEFA European Under-21 Football Championship. He was on the bench for Chelsea's League Cup match against Queens Park Rangers on 23 September 2009, but did not take any part in the 1–0 victory. Matić made his Premier League debut for Chelsea on 21 November, coming on as a substitute for Florent Malouda in the 69th minute in a 4–0 win over Wolverhampton Wanderers.

On 23 August 2010, Matić transferred to Eredivisie club Vitesse on a one-year loan, together with teammates Slobodan Rajković and Matej Delač.

Benfica

On 31 January 2011, Matić agreed to join Portuguese club Benfica in the summer of 2011, as part of a deal for Chelsea to sign Brazilian centre-back David Luiz. Under Benfica manager Jorge Jesus, Matić was converted from a playmaker into a defensive midfielder.

On 14 April 2012, Matić started for Benfica in the 2012 Taça da Liga Final against Gil Vicente, where he won his first trophy with the Lisbon-based club.

On 13 January 2013, Matić scored Benfica's first goal in a 2–2 draw with O Clássico rivals Porto. The next day, he was awarded with a contract extension lasting until 2018, with the buyout clause set at €45 million.

In the second leg of Benfica's Europa League round of 32 tie against Bayer Leverkusen, Matić headed in a late goal after a cross from Lima to seal a 3–1 aggregate victory. Matić was an integral member throughout the 2012–13 Primeira Liga campaign as Benfica looked to claim the club's first league championship since 2010. Going into the penultimate game of the season against Porto, both teams were undefeated in league play, but a stoppage-time winner from substitute Kelvin gave Porto a 2–1 victory.

On 15 May, Matić faced former employers Chelsea in the Europa League final in Amsterdam but was on the losing side as Benfica fell to a 2–1 defeat, courtesy of a last minute Branislav Ivanović header. On 4 July 2013, he was named Primeira Liga Player of the Year after having won the monthly award three times over the course of the season.

In the 2013–14 season, Matić played half of the season, with 22 matches and 3 goals, he helped Benfica to win the Primeira Liga and Taça de Portugal. On 13 January 2014, Matić placed second in the 2013 FIFA Puskás Award.

Return to Chelsea

On 15 January 2014, Matić rejoined Chelsea for a fee of £21 million (€25M), on a five-and-a-half-year contract. He made his second debut for the club four days later, replacing Willian in a 3–1 win against Manchester United.

On 3 February, Matić made his first Premier League start in Chelsea's fixture away at championship rivals Manchester City. He was named man of the match by Sky Sports as Chelsea ended City's unbeaten run at the City of Manchester Stadium with a 1–0 win.

Matić scored his first Premier League goal on 30 August 2014, in a 6–3 win at Everton. A month later, Matić scored the only goal as Chelsea won away at Sporting CP in the group stage of the Champions League; on 5 November in the same competition, his goal earned Chelsea a 1–1 draw at Maribor.

Matić was given a straight red card in Chelsea's 1–1 home draw against Burnley on 21 February 2015, for pushing over Ashley Barnes following a high tackle by him, which resulted in the bending of Matić's shin. On appeal, his suspension was shortened to two matches, including the League Cup Final.

On 26 April 2015, Matić was named as one of four midfielders in the PFA Team of the Year, alongside teammate Eden Hazard. Four more Chelsea players were included in the selection.

On 12 September 2015, Matić scored his first goal of the 2015–16 Premier League season against Everton, but it was not enough to save Chelsea from a 3–1 loss. Matić was sent off for two yellow cards in the first half of Chelsea's 2–1 loss at West Ham United on 24 October 2015.

For the majority of the 2016–17 Premier League season, Matić played as a central midfielder in a 3–4–3 formation. He scored the 4th goal in Chelsea's 4–2 FA Cup semi-final win over Tottenham Hotspur on 22 April 2017. On 8 May 2017, he scored his first ever goal at Stamford Bridge, in a 3–0 victory over Middlesbrough.

Manchester United

On 30 July 2017, a photo was leaked of Matić wearing a Manchester United training kit printed with the number 31 vacated by Bastian Schweinsteiger the previous March, fuelling rumours that Matić was on the verge of a reunion with former Chelsea manager José Mourinho. Manchester United confirmed the deal the next day, with Matić signing a three-year contract with an option for an extra year, for a fee reported to be in the region of £40 million.

Two days after signing, he made his first appearance in a friendly against Sampdoria, finishing in a 2–1 win over the Italian side. On 13 August 2017, Matić made his league debut in a 4–0 win over West Ham United at Old Trafford, in which he was named Man of the Match. On 5 March 2018, Matić scored his first goal for the club with a half-volley in a 3–2 comeback win over Crystal Palace after being 2–0 down. The goal was later voted Manchester United goal of the season.

During the boxing day matches of the 2018–19 Premier League, Matić scored his first goal of the season and his second for Manchester United in a 3–1 win over Huddersfield Town.

On 29 January 2020, Matić scored the only goal in a 1–0 derby win; however he was also sent off during the game which United lost 3–2 on aggregate.

On 17 March 2020, Manchester United announced that they would be triggering a clause in Matić's contract to extend it by another year rather than allowing it to expire in the summer of 2020, keeping him at the club for a fourth year. On 6 July 2020, Matić signed a new three-year contract with the club, securing his future until 2023.

On 15 April 2022, Matić announced he would be leaving the club at the end of the season.

Roma
On 14 June 2022, it was announced that Matić had agreed to join Roma on a one-year contract, following the expiry of his Manchester United contract. He joined on a free transfer. This was his third reunion with manager José Mourinho, having also played under him for Chelsea and Manchester United. "I already worked with him, we have a good connection and he is one of the reasons why I came here," Matic commented on Mourinho. On 14 August, he made his debut for the club, as a substitute, in a 1–0 away win against Salernitana in the Serie A.

International career
Matić's debut for the Serbia under-21 team came in a match against Denmark on 11 October 2008. After three matches and two goals for the Serbia under-21 squad, he was called up to the Serbian senior squad and made his debut in a friendly against Poland on 14 December 2008, in a 1–0 loss.

He played in the Cyprus International Football Tournament in 2009 where Serbia made it to the final.

Matić took part in the 2009 UEFA Euro Under-21 Championship, where he played 85 minutes in the first group match against Italy in a 0–0 draw. Matić, however, injured himself after contact with Italian forward Sebastian Giovinco. He broke the fifth metatarsal in his right foot and was forced to undergo surgery.

In December 2012, Matić announced he would not play for the Serbian national team while Siniša Mihajlović was the coach. The reason he gave for this decision is that he felt he was not given the right opportunity by the coach not playing a single minute in his last five call-ups. On 6 September 2013, Matić returned to his national team on a 2014 FIFA World Cup qualification match against Croatia, being sent off in the 75th minute.

He scored his first international goal on 29 March 2015, in a UEFA Euro 2016 qualifying match away to Portugal at the Estádio da Luz, equalising via an overhead kick, albeit in a 2–1 defeat. On 11 October, in a loss against the same opponents by the same score at the Partizan Stadium, Matić received a straight red card within a minute of teammate Aleksandar Kolarov's dismissal.

In June 2018, he was selected in the Serbian squad for the 2018 World Cup, playing all three group stage matches.

On 28 August 2020, the Football Association of Serbia announced that he had retired from international football; he made 48 appearances and scored two goals for Serbia. He earned his final cap against Luxembourg on 10 September 2019.

Style of play
A left-footed defensive midfielder, Matić's poise and power, in addition to his in-game intelligence and tactical awareness, have enabled his attacking teammates to flourish. He is often used at a holding position and screens the defence while providing cover for attacking movements. Just before he joined Manchester United, he had a tackle success rate of 75% in 123 Premier League appearances, a higher rate than N'Golo Kante, Ander Herrera, Fernandinho and Jordan Henderson. José Mourinho commented on Matić, "At this moment, he is a giant, not for his size but for the way he plays." Matić's qualities have led to comparison to his ex-teammate at Manchester United, Michael Carrick. Prior to joining Benfica, he played as an attacking midfielder, before being shifted to a holding midfield role.

Personal life
Matić's younger brother, Uroš, is also a professional footballer, playing for Abha Club, a team in Saudi Arabia. Matić is of partial Macedonian descent as his maternal grandfather is from Volkovija. Matić has three children with his wife, Aleksandra.

Matić has admired former Manchester United midfielder Roy Keane from an early age.

In November 2018, Matić refused to wear a Remembrance poppy on his shirt for a match against Bournemouth. After the match, Matić was castigated and got threats by a number of people via social networks for not respecting servicemen who have died in war. Matić stated that he will not wear a poppy because his village of Vrelo was hit by the NATO bombing of Yugoslavia in 1999.

Career statistics

Club

International

Serbia score listed first, score column indicates score after each Matić goal

Honours
Košice
Slovak Cup: 2008–09

Chelsea
Premier League: 2014–15, 2016–17
FA Cup: 2009–10; runner-up: 2016–17

Benfica
Primeira Liga: 2013–14
Taça da Liga: 2011–12
Taça de Portugal runner-up: 2012–13
UEFA Europa League runner-up: 2012–13

Manchester United
FA Cup runner-up: 2017–18
UEFA Europa League runner-up: 2020–21

Individual
LPFP Primeira Liga Player of the Year: 2012–13
Serbian Footballer of the Year: 2014, 2015
SJPF Player of the Month: December 2012, January 2013, April 2013
PFA Team of the Year: 2014–15 Premier League
Manchester United Goal of the Season: 2017–18 (vs. Crystal Palace, 5 March 2018)

References

External links

Profile at the A.S. Roma website
Profile on Serbian national football team website

1988 births
Living people
Sportspeople from Šabac
Serbian footballers
Serbia under-21 international footballers
Serbia international footballers
Association football midfielders
FK Kolubara players
FC VSS Košice players
Chelsea F.C. players
SBV Vitesse players
S.L. Benfica footballers
Manchester United F.C. players
A.S. Roma players
Slovak Super Liga players
Premier League players
Eredivisie players
Primeira Liga players
Serie A players
FA Cup Final players
2018 FIFA World Cup players
Serbian expatriate footballers
Expatriate footballers in Slovakia
Expatriate footballers in England
Expatriate footballers in the Netherlands
Expatriate footballers in Portugal
Expatriate footballers in Italy
Serbian expatriate sportspeople in Slovakia
Serbian expatriate sportspeople in England
Serbian expatriate sportspeople in the Netherlands
Serbian expatriate sportspeople in Portugal
Serbian expatriate sportspeople in Italy
Naturalized citizens of Slovakia
Serbian people of Macedonian descent
Slovak people of Macedonian descent
Slovak people of Serbian descent
Naturalised association football players